Naranjillo ("little orange") is a common name for several South American plants with edible fruit:

Solanum quitoense, usually spelled Naranjilla
Zanthoxylum naranjillo
Platonia esculenta